Trubar may refer to:
Trubar, Bihać, a village in Bihać municipality, Bosnia and Herzegovina
Trubar massacre, a civilian massacre committed by Chetniks on 27 July 1941
Primož Trubar (1508–1586), Protestant reformer